Nissi Ogulu (born 1994), known professionally as Nissi, is a Nigerian singer, songwriter, fine artist and founder of Creele Animation Studios. Ogulu was born to Bose and Samuel Ogulu and is the younger sister to Nigerian Afrobeats artiste Burna Boy. She started with music at six years old and went on to study Mechanical Engineering at the University of Warwick.

In 2021, she claimed to have been part of the Jaguar Land Rover engineering team of the that designed and put together the 2023 Range Rover Model and launched a charity NFT collection on the Binance NFT marketplace.

Discography

EPs 

 Ignite (2020)

Singles 

 "Criminal" (2016)
 "Pay Attention" (2016)
 "Familiar" (2016)
 "Over Here" (2019)
 "Move X2" (2021)
 "Gravity" (2022)

References

External links 

 

1995 births
Living people
Nigerian singer-songwriters
Nigerian women singer-songwriters
Afrobeat musicians
21st-century Nigerian businesspeople
21st-century Nigerian businesswomen